Scedella praetexta is a species of tephritid or fruit flies in the genus Scedella of the family Tephritidae.

Distribution
Congo, Rwanda, Burundi, Uganda, Tanzania, Zimbabwe, South Africa.

References

Tephritinae
Insects described in 1861
Diptera of Africa